Mithiani railway station 
() is  located in town of Mithiani, Sindh Pakistan.

See also
 List of railway stations in Pakistan
 Pakistan Railways

References

External links

Railway stations in Naushahro Feroze District